SCFC may refer to:

 Salford City F.C., an English football team
 Salisbury City F.C., an English football team
 Stalybridge Celtic F.C., an English football team
 Stockport County F.C., an English football team
 Stoke City F.C., an English football team
 Swansea City A.F.C., a Welsh football team
 São Carlos F.C., a Brazilian football team